Abhilash, more popularly known as My Dear Bootham Abhilash is an Indian actor who has worked in television serials as well as films of Telugu and Tamil languages. Abhilash rose to prominence as the central character of the Tamil serial My Dear Bhootham.

Career

Abhilash made his debut with the Telugu serial Vichitra Katha Mallika, followed by the serials Veetuku Veedu Looti and Vikramadithyan. He also done the serials Magal, Gokulathil Seethai, Abirami and Kodi Mullai. Abhilash, a Bachelor of Computer Science, is best known for his role in My Dear Bhootham, but he has also worked as production controller for the films 465 and Nagesh Thiraiyarangam.

After playing the villain in Nagesh Thiraiyarangam, Abhilash played the lead role in Dhoni Kabadi Kuzhu and has produced Cinderella. Abhilash considers senior actor Vietnam Veedu Sundaram as his mentor.

Filmography

Television

References

External links 

  

Living people
Indian male film actors
Male actors in Tamil cinema
21st-century Indian male actors
Year of birth missing (living people)
Indian television male child actors
People from Nellore district
Male actors from Andhra Pradesh
Male actors in Telugu television